Edwin Frederick Gerner (July 22, 1897 – May 15, 1970), nicknamed "Lefty", was a Major League Baseball pitcher who played in five games for the Cincinnati Reds in .

In 17 innings over five games, Gerner posted a 1-0 record with a 3.18 earned run average with 22 hits allowed, 10 runs allowed (6 earned), 3 walks, 2 strikeouts and 2 hit by pitch.

External links
 Baseball-Reference.com

1897 births
1970 deaths
Cincinnati Reds players
Major League Baseball pitchers
Baseball players from Pennsylvania